John Findlay Hammond Boothroyd (born March 9, 1999) is a Canadian field hockey player who plays in the forward position.

Career

Olympics
Boothroyd was selected to represent Canada at the 2020 Summer Olympics.

References

External links
 
 
 
 
 

1999 births
Canadian male field hockey players
Living people
Field hockey players from Vancouver
Field hockey players at the 2020 Summer Olympics
Olympic field hockey players of Canada
Male field hockey forwards
West Vancouver Field Hockey Club players
20th-century Canadian people
21st-century Canadian people